Elliott Mealer (born June 30, 1989) is a former offensive lineman for the Omaha Mammoths of the Fall Experimental Football League (FXFL). Mealer was an American football center for the Michigan Wolverines. He appeared in 50 games, making 13 starts at center. On April 27, 2013, Elliott signed a free agent contract with the New Orleans Saints. On July 5, 2014, Mealer signed with the SaberCats. He has also played with the San Jose Sabercats of the Arena Football League.

High School career
Mealer played as an offensive tackle while at Wauseon High. He was a three-year varsity starter. Rivals.com named him a PrepStar Magazine All-American and was ranked No. 24 offensive tackle in the country and 14th-best player in the state of Ohio. Scout.com named Mealer a four-star prospect and ranked him 28th-best offensive tackle prospect in the nation. During the senior year, Mealer was named Northwest Ohio Division IV Offensive Lineman of the Year.

College career
After redshirting in 2008, Mealer played for the University of Michigan. He played 11 games during the 2009 season. He went on to start 13 of the 50 total games in which he played from 2009 to 2012. While in school, Mealer attended the University of Michigan's College of Literature, Science, and the Arts majoring in general studies.

Professional career

NFL (2013)
As a free agent, Mealer joined the NFL on April 27, 2013, upon signing a 3-year contract with the New Orleans Saints for $1,495,000, including a guaranteed $5,000 signing bonus. Mealer was assigned to play as a guard but was released on August 31, 2013 as a result of the team's final roster cuts.

AFL (2014)
Mealer joined the Arena Football League upon signing with the SaberCats on July 5, 2014.

FXFL (2014)
Mealer joined the Omaha Mammoths in 2014 however, the team ceased operations the same year.

Acting career
In 2020, Mealer appeared in a Geico commercial about a baby reveal.

Personal life
During December 2007, Mealer survived a car accident that killed Mealer's girlfriend and his father. Mealer's brother Brock was paralyzed from the waist down in the same accident. His brother began physical therapy with the help of former U-M strength coach Mike Barwis.

External links
Michigan Wolverines Bio

References

Michigan Wolverines football players
1989 births
Living people
People from Wauseon, Ohio
Players of American football from Ohio
American football centers
San Jose SaberCats players
Omaha Mammoths players